The Volvo LV180/190 and 290-series, or the Longnose was a truck produced by Swedish automaker Volvo between 1937 and 1951.

Volvo LV180/190 
The LV180/190-series was presented in the beginning of 1937. The truck shared both front end and engine with the smaller LV90-series while other components were sturdier to cope with heavier loads.

Production ceased in 1943 and the LV180/190-series was replaced by larger versions of the Roundnose.

Volvo LV290 
The "Longnose" LV290 was Volvo's largest truck so far. With trailing axle the gross weight could reach 13 tonnes. It had a new overhead valve engine, designed by Gotthard Österberg who had come to Volvo when Tidaholm ceased production in 1933. To cover the engine the LV290 had an even longer bonnet than the LV180/190 trucks. During the Second World War many of these trucks had their engines converted to run on wood gas.

From 1947 onwards the LV290 series could be delivered with Volvo's pre-chamber diesel engine VDB. On these trucks the bonnet had been extended even further to accommodate the large engine. A few trucks were fitted with the larger direct injected VDF engine in 1951 before the Longnose was succeeded by Volvo Titan.

Engines

Gallery

References

External links 

 Volvo Trucks Global - history
 Swedish brass cars - picture gallery

Longnose
Vehicles introduced in 1937